Partido Unión Republicana (Republican Union Party) was a political party in Puerto Rico. The party formed in early 1932 from the merger of Partido Republicano Puro and Partido Alianza Puertorriqueña.  Its president was Rafael Martínez Nadal. It existed from 1932 to 1940. After the 1936 elections, Partido Unión Republicana reconstituted itself as Partido Unión Republicana Progresista.

Trajectory
The party formed early in 1932 from the union of Partido Republicano Puro and Partido Alianza Puertorriqueña, after the dissolution of Partido Alianza Puertorriqueña and the reconciliation between the Republicanos Puro and the Republicanos who had left Partido Republicano in 1928. However, before the 1932 elections, Partido Unión Republicana joined forces with the Partido Socialista to form Coalición Republicana Socialista. The pact between these two parties (Unión Republicana and Socialista) was renewed before the 1936 elections to continue in force during that electoral cycle.

Subsequent to the 1936 elections, Partido Unión Republicana reconstituted itself as Partido Unión Republicana Progresista, with Celestino Iriarte as its president. Later on yet, in 1948, Partido Unión Republicana re-branded itself as Partido Estadista Puertorriqueño.

See also

References

Further reading 
 José Trías Monge, Puerto Rico: The Trials of the Oldest Colony in the World (Yale University Press, 1997)

External links
 Elecciones en Puerto Rico.
 Coaliciones, alianzas, y uniones entre las colectividades (1896-1945) by CECANGPR
 Entre 1920 y 1924 on Pomarrosas

Defunct political parties in Puerto Rico
Political parties established in 1932
1936 disestablishments
Statehood movement in Puerto Rico
Political parties in Puerto Rico